Michele Scandiffio (29 September 1928 – 6 June 2022) was an Italian Roman Catholic prelate.

Scandiffio was ordained to the priesthood in 1951. He served as the archbishop of the Roman Catholic Archdiocese of Acerenza, Italy from 1988 until his retirement in 2005.

References

1928 births
2022 deaths
Italian Roman Catholic archbishops
Bishops in Basilicata
People from the Province of Matera